William J Bruce III (born March 4, 1980)  is a Canadian author and publicist best known for his work with former NFL players as well as former wrestler Ted DiBiase.

2003–2004: Career beginnings
Bruce started his career while attending Kingston College in Niagara Falls, Canada. While in attendance there a neighbor broke a gas line. The school was evacuated and it was at this point that Bruce met a production manager who introduced him to the film Home Beyond the Sun (which is a film directed and produced by Academy Award winner Colin Chilvers).

2007–2010: Publicist
In March 2007, Bruce became the publicist and ministerial booking agent to the "Million Dollar Man" Ted DiBiase of World Wrestling Entertainment, a position he held until late 2010

Bruce has also worked as publicist to athletes like NFL player Shawn Harper and author Bill Bean of Discovery Channel.

2010–present

Bruce served as the executive producer for the 2011 album "Bridge Wars" which features artists such as F.E.R.N (produced by DukeDaGod of The Diplomats), Mahogany Jones (four-time Champion of BET’s "Freestyle Friday's" battle competitions) and Brookyln’s own L.G. Wise.

In 2014 Bruce appeared as gang leader Mario "KingPin" Harris in the film Lost Penny; a film that starred Rachael McOwen of The Amazing Spider-Man 2 and won at the Manhattan Film Festival

Starting in 2016 Bruce hosted the Aussie Osbourne Show with guests Kyle Mills, Gayle Lynds, and Lisa See.

Filmography
 2004: Home Beyond the Sun
 2009: In the Blink of an Eye

Bibliography
Penholder (Queensbridge Publishing)  
The Calling (Polar Expressions Publishing) 
Fire And Light (Poetry Institute of Canada)

References

External links

American public relations people
Living people
1980 births